Armando Segato (3 May 1930 – 19 February 1973) was an Italian footballer and manager who played as a midfielder.

Club career
Armando Segato was born in Vicenza, Italy. He played as a left halfback for the fabulous Fiorentina side of the 1950s, which won one Serie A championship during the 1955–56 season, followed by 4 consecutive 2nd-place finishes, and also reached the 1957 European Cup Final, only to lose to Real Madrid. In 1961 Fiorentina became the first Italian team to win a European title, the 1961 Cup Winners Cup, but he had just left Florence for a smaller Italian side, Udinese, where he closed his career in Serie B in 1964.

International career
With the Italy national team, Segato was among the most featured players in the decade, obtaining 20 caps between 1953 and 1959. He took part at the 1954 World Cup and played in a game against Switzerland.

Style of play
A left halfback, Segato was known in particular to the 'Viola' fans for his accurate left-footed defence-splitting passes and crosses, which often met the runs of Fiorentina team-mates Julinho and Virgili. He was known to be a loyal, correct and athletic midfielder, who was known for leading by example on the pitch, and was well-respected by both his opponents and team-mates alike.

References
 La Gazzetta dello Sport

1930 births
1973 deaths
Italian footballers
Association football midfielders
Udinese Calcio players
ACF Fiorentina players
Cagliari Calcio players
A.C. Prato players
Serie A players
Italy international footballers
1954 FIFA World Cup players
Sportspeople from Vicenza
Italian football managers
Udinese Calcio managers
Footballers from Veneto